Nitroplus Co., Ltd., currently styled as NITRO PLUS, formerly stylized as nitro+, and formerly known as "OKStyle", is a Japanese visual novel video game developer that has developed a number of visual novels, including eroge. They also have been collaborating with developer Type-Moon to create the light novel series Fate/Zero. Their works usually have dark themes such as reanimation of the dead, rape and murder. They also have a branch of the company called Nitro+chiral, which focuses on Boys' Love visual novels. Writers aligned with the company, such as Gen Urobuchi, have also contributed to various manga, anime, novel, and television works.

Super Sonico is the mascot of Nitroplus' annual music festival event, "Nitro Super Sonico", since 2006. Nitroplus has held their music festival every year since 2000. Originally Ouka Satsurikuin was Nitroplus' original mascot before Super Sonico had appeared.

List of works
Phantom of Inferno (February 25, 2000)
Vampirdzhija Vjedogonia (January 26, 2001)
Kikokugai: The Cyber Slayer (March 29, 2002)
"Hello, world." (September 27, 2002)
Zanma Taisei Demonbane (April 25, 2003)
Saya no Uta (December 26, 2003)
Phantom INTEGRATION (September 17, 2004)
Angelos Armas -Tenshi no Nichou Kenju- (January 28, 2005)
Jingai Makyō (June 24, 2005)
Hanachirasu (September 30, 2005)
Sabbat Nabe (December, 2005)
Dra†KoI (February 3, 2006)
Kishin Hishou Demonbane (May 26, 2006)
Gekkō no Carnevale (January 26, 2007)
Zoku Satsuriku no Django -Jigoku no Shoukinkubi- (July 27, 2007)
Sumaga (September 26, 2008)
Sumaga Special (June 26, 2009)
Full Metal Daemon: Muramasa (October 30, 2009)
Axanael (December 17, 2010)
SoniComi (November 25, 2011)
Phenomeno (June 16, 2012)
Guilty Crown: Lost Christmas (July 27, 2012)
Kimi to Kanojo to Kanojo no Koi (June 28, 2013) (Officially localized as You and Me and Her: A Love Story)
Expelled from Paradise (November 15, 2014)
Nitroplus Blasterz: Heroines Infinite Duel (April 30, 2015, developed by Examu)
Tokyo Necro (January 29, 2016)
Minikui Mojika no Ko (July 27, 2018)
Smile of the Arsnotoria (March 4, 2021)

They also released a fighting game Nitro+ Royale -Heroines Duel- (ニトロ+ロワイヤル -ヒロインズデュエル-) at the 2007 Comiket.

5pb. x Nitro+
Chaos;Head (April 25, 2008)
Chaos;Head Noah (February 26, 2009)
Steins;Gate (October 15, 2009)
Chaos;Head Love Chu Chu! (March 25, 2010)

DMM x Nitro+
Nitro+ and DMM Corporation released a web browser game called Touken Ranbu in January 2015, which as of March 2015 is one of DMM's most popular games, second only to the largely popular Kantai Collection.

Nitro+Chiral branch works
Nitro+Chiral focused to boys-love games.
 Togainu no Chi (February 25, 2005/May 29, 2008)
 Lamento -Beyond the Void- (November 10, 2006)
 Sweet Pool (December 19, 2008)
 DRAMAtical Murder (March 23, 2012)
 DRAMAtical Murder re:connect (April 26, 2013)
 Slow Damage (February 25, 2021)
On January 25, 2008, they released a minigame disk titled CHiRALmori under this branch of which uses chibi versions of the characters from Togainu no Chi and Lamento.

References

External links

 
Nitro+Chiral website

 
Video game companies of Japan
Video game development companies
Japanese companies established in 2000
Video game companies established in 2000
Software companies based in Tokyo
Taitō